Glodeni District is a district in northwestern Moldova, with its administrative center at Glodeni. , its population was 61,900. The district consists of 35 localities, 18 communes, 16 villages and one city (Glodeni).

History
The oldest area in the district is the Cobani, which dates back to June 3, 1374. Other old localities include Balatina, Camenca, Cuhnești, and Iabloana, founded between 1429 and 1442. During the 15th–17th centuries Glodeni continued to develop as a trade and economic region, with a significant increase in population. In 1616, a district center was documented as Glodeni.

Since the 17th and 18th centuries, the region has been fueled by wars with the Polish–Lithuanian Commonwealth and the Ottoman and Russian Empires. In 1812, the region was occupied by the Russian Empire; with the local population of Moldovans and Ukrainians, Russians constitute 22 percent of the population. After the collapse of the Russian Empire in 1917, Bessarabia decided to unite with Romania. In 1940, Bessarabia was occupied by the USSR after the Molotov–Ribbentrop pact. From 1944 to 1991, the Glodeni District was part of the Moldavian Soviet Socialist Republic (MSSR). After the 1991 independence of Moldova, the Glodeni District was part of Bălți County until 2003, when it became a district.

Geography
Glodeni District is bordered by Riscani District on the north, Balti Municipality on the east, Falesti District on the south and Romania on the west. The district is a hilly plain, fragmented by valleys which are higher in the west with a slight incline to their merge with the Prut. In the western part of the district, the localities of Balatina, Cobani, Butesti, and Camenca possess a number of natural resources, including gravel and sand (near the Prut), building stone (Balatina, Butesti, Camenca, Cobani), limestone (Cuhnesti, Viişoara) and clay (Glodeni, Danu and Iabloana). Soils are primarily Chernozemic and loamy.

Climate
The annual average temperature is  degrees. In January, the average temperature is  degrees and  degrees in July.

Fauna
The district has fauna typical of Central Europe, including fox, weasel, marten, deer, woodpecker, turtle dove and pheasant in forests and boar, ondatra, otter, duck, wild cat, egret near the Prut. gopher, field mice, rabbits and partridges inhabit the steppe regions.

Flora
Forests occupy 8.5 percent of the district, and consist of oak, acacia, poplar, ash, maple, elm and hazel. Undergrowth includes blackthorn and blackberry. Steppe and forest steppe vegetation includes grasses, knotweed, clover and wormwood.

Pădurea Domnească

The Pădurea Domnească nature reserve is located in the mid-Prut Valley area, extending  between Criva and Pruteni. A forest under state protection since 1993, it is one of the most valuable meadows and old floodplain forests in Europe.

Rivers
The Prut borders Romania. Smaller rivers include the Camenca, Căldăruşa and the Glodeni (in the Prut basin) and Copăceanca (in the Răut River basin). The district contains  of lakes and ponds, which are popular summer retreats for tourists and local people.

Demographics
On January 1, 2012, the district population was 61,400, of which 18.9% was urban and 81.1% was rural population. There were 700 births in 2010, (11.3 per 1000) and 900 deaths (14.5 per 1000), for a decrease in population of 200 (−3.2 per 1000).

Ethnic groups 

Footnote: * There is an ongoing controversy regarding the ethnic identification of Moldovans and Romanians.

Religion 
Christians: 98.1%
Orthodox Christians: 96.3%
Protestant: 1.4%
Baptists: 1.1%
Seventh-day Adventists: 0.1%
Pentecostals: 0.1%
Evangelicals: 0.1%
Catholics: 0.4%
Other: 1.3%
None: 0.4%
Atheists: 0.2%

Economy
The district has a total of 6,500 registered companies; however, agriculture is the most important sector. Agricultural land comprises  (74.7 percent) of the total land area. Arable land comprises  (56.1 percent) of total agricultural land, which includes orchards (or 2.9 percent), vineyards (or 1 percent) and pasture (or 14.3 percent). Crops include sunflowers, sugar beets, tobacco and cereals. Livestock and milk production is practiced intensively only on farms in Danu and Sturzovca.

Education
The district operates 32 kindergartens, two primary schools, 10 secondary schools, eight general-education schools and eight higher-education institutes serving a student population of 9,158. Vocational training is available in Glodeni and Ciuciulea.

Politics
From 2001 to 2009, Glodeni District was part of the "north red" electoral region, in which the Party of Communists of the Republic of Moldova (PCRM) usually received over 50 percent of the vote. However, in the 2009 July elections the PCRM lost to the Alliance for European Integration (AEI). During the last three elections, the AEI has increased 107.7%.

Elections

|-
!style="background-color:#E9E9E9" align=center colspan="2" valign=center|Parties and coalitions
!style="background-color:#E9E9E9" align=right|Votes
!style="background-color:#E9E9E9" align=right|%
!style="background-color:#E9E9E9" align=right|+/−
|-
| 
|align=left|Party of Communists of the Republic of Moldova
|align="right"|11,570
|align="right"|43.62
|align="right"|−4.10
|-
| 
|align=left|Liberal Democratic Party of Moldova
|align="right"|6,540
|align="right"|24.66
|align="right"|+5.76
|-
| 
|align=left|Democratic Party of Moldova
|align="right"|4,514
|align="right"|17,02
|align="right"|+3.58
|-
| 
|align=left|Liberal Party
|align="right"|1,159
|align="right"|4.37
|align="right"|−4.06
|-
| 
|align=left|Party Alliance Our Moldova
|align="right"|901
|align="right"|3.40
|align="right"|−4.19
|-
|bgcolor="grey"|
|align=left|Gabriel Stati (independent)
|align="right"|305
|align="right"|1.15
|align="right"|+1.15
|-
|bgcolor=#0033cc|
|align=left|European Action Movement
|align="right"|299
|align="right"|1.13
|align="right"|+1.13
|-
|bgcolor="grey"|
|align=left|Humanist Party of Moldova
|align="right"|282
|align="right"|1.06
|align="right"|+1.06
|-
|bgcolor="grey"|
|align=left|Other
|align="right"|1,257
|align="right"|3.59
|align="right"|-0.33
|-
|align=left style="background-color:#E9E9E9" colspan="2"|Total (turnout 57.25%)
|width="30" align="right" style="background-color:#E9E9E9"|26,743
|width="30" align="right" style="background-color:#E9E9E9"|100.00
|width="30" align="right" style="background-color:#E9E9E9"|

Culture

The district has a children's center, schools of art, music and fine arts, 27 cultural houses, 35 public libraries, five museums, 97 works of art and 17 musical groups.

Health
Glodeni has a 200-bed hospital, 13 family practitioners, 10 health centers, 4 health offices and 26 pharmacies.

Notable residents 
 Aurel Saulea: Member of the Moldavian Parliament 1990–1994
 Costache Leancă: Bessarabian politician, president of Bălți County general assembly 1917–1918
 Igor Klipii: Politician and diplomat
 Vasile Coroban: Writer

References

External links
 District population per year (in Romanian)
 Descrierea generală a raionului Glodeni (in Romanian)

 
Districts of Moldova